The National Women's League is the top division of the All Nepal Football Association in Nepal.

Clubs

Current clubs 
The following are the 8 clubs who compete in the National Women's League during the 2022 season.

Champions 
Since the start of the league, 5 different clubs have won the title in 10 tournaments. Nepal Police Club have the most (4 titles) under their belt.

References

Football in Nepal